Anke Huber was the defending champion but did not compete that year.

Amanda Coetzer won in the final 6–4, 3–6, 7–5 against Barbara Paulus.

Seeds
A champion seed is indicated in bold text while text in italics indicates the round in which that seed was eliminated. The top two seeds received a bye to the second round.

  Amanda Coetzer (champion)
  Karina Habšudová (second round)
  Sandrine Testud (second round)
  Sabine Appelmans (quarterfinals)
  Barbara Paulus (final)
  Yayuk Basuki (first round)
  Kimberly Po (second round)
  Natasha Zvereva (first round)

Draw

Final

Section 1

Section 2

External links
 ITF tournament edition details
 WTA tournament draws

1997 WTA Tour
Luxembourg Open
1997 in Luxembourgian tennis